Nais was a town of ancient Lydia, inhabited during Roman times. 

Its site is located about one mile (1.6 km) south of İnay in Asiatic Turkey.

References

Populated places in ancient Lydia
Former populated places in Turkey
Roman towns and cities in Turkey
History of Uşak Province
Ulubey District